Josef Jungmann (12 November 1830, in Münster – 25 November 1885, in Innsbruck) was a German-Austrian Catholic theologian.

Life
From 1850 he studied theology and philosophy at the Collegium Germanicum in Rome, becoming ordained as a priest in 1855. In 1857 he became a member of the Society of Jesus, and during the following year, relocated as a lecturer to the University of Innsbruck. At Innsbruck, he became a professor of ecclesiastical eloquence and catechetics at the university as well as a professor of liturgy at the theological konvikt.

Selected works 
 Die Schönheit und die schöne Kunst: nach den Anschauungen der sokratischen und der christlichen Philosophie in ihrem Wesen dargestellt (1866) – Beauty and fine art: according to the views of the Socratic and Christian philosophy represented in nature.
 Das Gemüth, und das Gefühlsvermögen der neueren Psychologie (1868) – The mind and the ability to feel the modern psychology.
 Aesthetik (3rd edition, 1886) – Aesthetics.
 Theorie der geistlichen Beredsamkeit : akademische Vorlesungen (2 volumes, 3rd edition 1895) – Theory of spiritual eloquence: academic lectures.

References 

1830 births
1885 deaths
People from Münster
Catecheticists
Collegium Germanicum et Hungaricum alumni
Academic staff of the University of Innsbruck
19th-century German Catholic theologians
19th-century Austrian Roman Catholic theologians